Skookumchuck is a populated place in Thurston County, Washington. It is located east of Offutt Lake and northwest of Rainier. The Chehalis Western Trail passes through the community.

References

Unincorporated communities in Thurston County, Washington